Hossein Tahami is an Iranian retired freestyle wrestler. He won a bronze medal at the 1966 World Championships.

References

Iranian male sport wrestlers
World Wrestling Championships medalists
Asian Games medalists in wrestling
Wrestlers at the 1966 Asian Games
Asian Games silver medalists for Iran
Medalists at the 1966 Asian Games
Possibly living people